Alfred Forbes was Dean of Ferns from 1936 until 1949.Forbes was educated  at Trinity College Dublin and ordained in 1921.  After a curacies in Enniscorthy and Preban he held incumbencies at Carnew  and Kilscoran until his appointment as Dean.

Notes

Alumni of Trinity College Dublin
Deans of Ferns